The Memphis–Ole Miss football rivalry, also known as the Mid–South Rivalry, is an American college football rivalry game between the Tigers of the University of Memphis and the Rebels of the University of Mississippi. The series began in 1921. Ole Miss leads 47–12–2 through the 2019 season.

Football series history
As of 2019, Ole Miss is tied as Memphis's most frequent opponent, and Memphis is Ole Miss's most common non-conference opponent. The two schools, separated by around 80 miles, first met in 1921, with Ole Miss winning the first 17 games. The 1963 game had a scoreless tie, and Memphis won its first game in the series in 1967. From 1962 to 1995, the series was played annually except 1975 in Oxford; Memphis; and Jackson, Mississippi.

On October 17, 2015, Memphis upset no. 13 Ole Miss 37–24. It was the first time the Tigers defeated the Rebels since 2004 and first win over a ranked opponent since 1996. Memphis was Ole Miss's homecoming opponent on October 1, 2016, and no. 16 Ole Miss won 48–28. However, in early 2019, Ole Miss vacated 33 wins from the 2010 to 2016 seasons, including the 2014 and 2016 wins over Memphis, due to NCAA violations.

With the 63rd meeting between Memphis and Ole Miss on August 31, 2019, a 15–10 Memphis win in Memphis, Ole Miss became tied with Southern Miss as Memphis's most frequent opponent.

Rivalry debate
It is disputed if this series can be considered a traditional rivalry. As early as 1994, The Commercial Appeal in Memphis referred to the Memphis–Ole Miss football series as a "Mid-South rivalry." In later years, "Mid-South rivalry" began to be used by the Memphis and Ole Miss athletic departments as well as media outlets like SB Nation.

Prior to the 2019 football game, former Ole Miss receiver A. J. Brown tweeted that the series was "not a rivalry," and Ole Miss quarterback Matt Corral answered "no" when asked by a reporter if he considered Ole Miss and Memphis to be rivals.

There are no future scheduled games between Memphis and Ole Miss.

Game results

Other sports
In contrast to Ole Miss dominating the football series, Memphis has a 27–14 lead over Ole Miss in men's basketball as of 2020 in a series dating back to 1922. Most recently, no. 16 Memphis defeated Ole Miss 87–86 in Memphis on November 23, 2019.

Ole Miss women's basketball has a 33–13 series lead over Memphis in a series that was played from 1972 to 2009. Ole Miss has a four-game winning streak in the series, most recently winning 73–72 at Memphis on December 18, 2009.
	 
In women's volleyball, Memphis and Ole Miss had at least one meeting per season from 1993 to 2007 but met only twice since 2008. Ole Miss has a narrow 36–33 series lead over Memphis; the most recent game was a 3–2 Memphis win in Oxford on September 11, 2018, the first Memphis win at Ole Miss since 1995.

Ole Miss leads the baseball series over Memphis 60–39 as of 2020.

See also
 List of NCAA college football rivalry games

References

College football rivalries in the United States
Memphis Tigers football
Ole Miss Rebels football